Riverlawn, also known as the Cordelia Murray House and Zacharias home is a historic home located near Mathews, Mathews County, Virginia. It was built in 1874, and is a -story, frame dwelling in a vernacular Federal style. The house has a four-over-four, central hall floor plan. Additions were made and it was renovated in 1929.  Also on the property are a contributing well, stone well and a pair of contributing brick gateposts.

It was listed on the National Register of Historic Places in 2012.

References

Houses on the National Register of Historic Places in Virginia
Federal architecture in Virginia
Houses completed in 1874
Houses in Mathews County, Virginia
National Register of Historic Places in Mathews County, Virginia